Ivo Krasimirov Ivanov (born 30 April 1985) is a Bulgarian footballer who plays as a midfielder.

Career
In July 2017, Ivanov returned to Lokomotiv Sofia.

On 2 July 2018, Ivanov joined Minyor Pernik.

References

External links
 
 

1985 births
Living people
Sportspeople from Pleven
Bulgarian footballers
Association football midfielders
PFC Spartak Pleven players
FC Lokomotiv 1929 Sofia players
FC Lyubimets players
PFC CSKA Sofia players
FC Septemvri Sofia players
PFC Minyor Pernik players
First Professional Football League (Bulgaria) players
Second Professional Football League (Bulgaria) players
Bulgaria under-21 international footballers